The 2008 Dublin Women's Soccer League was the 15th season of the women's association football league featuring teams from the Greater Dublin Area. With a team that included Mary Waldron and Grainne Kierans, St Francis finished as champions. They also won the 2008 FAI Women's Cup, defeating Peamount United 2–1 in the final at Richmond Park.

Final tables

Premier League A

Premier League B

References

2008
2007–08 domestic women's association football leagues
2008–09 domestic women's association football leagues
2008 in Republic of Ireland association football leagues
1